The osprey (Pandion haliaetus) is a medium large raptor which is a specialist fish-eater with a worldwide distribution. The subspecies Pandion haliaetus haliaetus is native to Eurasia and is found in the British Isles, where it is a scarce breeder primarily in Scotland with smaller numbers in England and Wales. It became extinct in the British Isles in 1916, but recolonised in 1954. Scandinavian birds migrate through Britain on the way to their breeding sites.

History
The osprey formerly inhabited much of Britain, but heavy persecution, mainly by Victorian egg and skin collectors, during the nineteenth century and early twentieth century brought about its demise.  The osprey became extinct as a breeding bird in England in 1840.  It is generally considered that the species was absent from Scotland from 1916 to 1954, although there is some evidence it continued to breed in Strathspey in the 1930s and 40s.  It is not thought to have inhabited Wales at this time: in Ireland it appears to have died out in the early nineteenth century.

Recolonisation

Recolonisation of Scotland
In 1954 Scandinavian birds re-colonised Scotland naturally and a pair has nested successfully almost every year since 1959 at Loch Garten Osprey Centre, Abernethy Forest Reserve, in the Scottish Highlands. The Osprey Centre at Loch Garten has become one of the most well-known conservation sites in the UK and has attracted over 2 million visitors since 1959.

The early re-colonisation was very slow because of contamination of the food chain by organochlorine pesticides and the activities of egg collectors. As a result, the breeding population had reached only 14 pairs by 1976. To protect the birds and increase their survival rates, "Operation Osprey" was launched. Barbed wire and electric wires were placed around the trees the birds nested in and a watch was kept over them through the night. Fifteen years later, in 1991, the number of pairs had increased to 71. In 2001, 158 breeding pairs were located, mainly in Scotland. In 2023 RSPB estimated there were over 240 nesting pairs in Great Britain.

Some chicks from Scottish nests have been moved to England and Spain (Urdaibai Bird Center) to establish new breeding populations.

In 2022  Sacha Dench led a project which followed 3 satellite tagged juvenile ospreys from the osprey project in the Tweed Valley Forest Park on their first migration south. Two of the young ospreys perished; the third was reported in November 2022 to be in Spain

Reintroduction to England
Because of the slow geographical spread of breeding ospreys within Scotland, in 1996 English Nature and Scottish Natural Heritage licensed a project to re-introduce the osprey to central England.  Over six years, chicks from Scottish nests were moved to the Nature Reserve at Rutland Water in the Midlands area, where they were released.  Funding was provided by Anglian Water and the Leicestershire and Rutland Wildlife Trust managed the project supported by a large team of volunteers.

In 1999 some of the translocated birds returned after their migration from Africa and in 2001 the first pair bred, including the eponymous Mr Rutland. In 2022 there were 26 adult ospreys and up to 10 breeding pairs in the area of Rutland Water.

Recolonisation of England
In 1999 a pair from the Scottish population bred for the first time in the Lake District at Bassenthwaite Lake. In 2021 there were 6 established nests in the Lake District where ospreys raised a total of 15 chicks.

In June 2009 a pair produced three young at Kielder Forest; these are the first to breed at Kielder for over 200 years. In 2021 there were seven occupied nests at Kielder which in May of that year contained at least 16 recently laid eggs.

In 2017 a project was started to reintroduce ospreys to the Poole Harbour area. The first egg at a nest site put in place by the project was laid in 2022. Two chicks hatched in early June 2022 and were ringed in July. One of the chicks died in August after a predation attempt by a goshawk. 

In 2022 further locations where ospreys had bred successfully for the first time were made public in North Yorkshire  and Leicestershire.

Recolonisation of Wales

An unexpected result of the Rutland translocation project was the establishment of two nests in Wales in 2004. One was near Welshpool in Montgomeryshire and the other at the RSPB Glaslyn Osprey Project at Pont Croesor, near Porthmadog in north Wales. In both cases the adult male, although originally from Scotland, had been translocated to Rutland. In 2022 the female osprey at Glaslyn returned for a 19th breeding season at the site, from which she has raised 41 young. 

In 2011 the Dyfi Osprey Project reported that an unringed male osprey and a female which fledged from Rutland Water in 2008 had successfully raised chicks at a new nest site near the river Dyfi in Wales. By the end of 2019 the project had raised 19 chicks. 

In 2012 a new nest was reported in Snowdonia, and  a single chick hatched successfully. Since 2014 ospreys have been nesting successfully near Clywedog Reservoir in Powys, and in 2018 a pair nested successfully for the first time at Llyn Brenig.

Legal protection
Ospreys are a species listed in Schedule 1 of the Wildlife and Countryside Act 1981. Offences under this act include, taking or owning eggs, damaging the birds or the nesting sites, and "intentionally or recklessly disturbing the bird while it is building a nest or is in, on or near a nest containing eggs or young or disturbing dependent young of such a bird"

Viewing and tracking
The websites of the wildlife organisations which protect and manage access to the nest sites at Loch Garten, Rutland Water, the Woodland Trust's Loch Arkaig, WWT Caerlaverock, Scottish Wildlife Trust at Loch of the Lowes and Dyfi, stream live webcam pictures of nesting birds during the breeding season (typically April–September).  Loch Garten, Dyfi and the Highland Foundation for Wildlife have fitted satellite trackers to some chicks to improve understanding of migratory behaviour.  The exact location of many nests is not widely disclosed due to the risk of eggs being stolen by egg collectors which, despite being made illegal in 1981 under the Wildlife and Countryside Act, continues to present a threat to rare nesting birds.

Ringing
Many ospreys can be identified due to bird ringing carried out under the scheme administered by the British Trust for Ornithology (BTO). Ospreys which have been ringed in Britain in recent years have a BTO metal ring one leg, and field readable blue "Darvic" ring on the other. Any UK sighting of a colour ringed osprey should be reported to the Roy Dennis Wildlife Foundation which coordinates the ringing of the species nationally.

References

External links
 RSPB A to Z of UK Birds
 Loch Garten Osprey Diary
 RSPB Loch Garten
 Ospreys at Rutland Water
 Lake District Ospreys
 Glaslyn Ospreys
 BBC News Release
 BBC News Release
 Dyfi Osprey Project
 Kielder Ospreys
 Highland Foundation for Wildlife
 Tweed Valley Ospreys
 UK Ospreys
 Osprey data

Birds in the United Kingdom